María de los Ángeles Mantilla Ramírez is a Mexican chemical engineer whose research involves photochemistry, photocatalysis, and nanomaterials, particularly for water treatment applications. She is a professor and researcher in CICATA Querétaro, the Research Center for Applied Science and Advance Technology of the Instituto Politécnico Nacional.

Education and career
Mantilla studied chemical engineering at the Universidad Veracruzana, earning a degree in 1990. She went to the National Autonomous University of Mexico (UNAM) for graduate study, earning a master's degree in industrial administration in 1996. in 2005 she earned a second master's degree in materials science through UAM Azcapotzalco. She completed her Ph.D. in 2010, at CICATA.

After working as a researcher for the Mexican Petroleum Institute from 1991 to 2004, and as a visiting professor at UAM Azcapotzalco in 2007–2008, she took her present position at CICATA in 2011.

Recognition
Mantilla is a member of the Mexican Academy of Sciences.

References

External links

Year of birth missing (living people)
Living people
Mexican chemical engineers
Mexican women engineers
Women chemical engineers
Universidad Veracruzana alumni
National Autonomous University of Mexico alumni
Academic staff of the Instituto Politécnico Nacional
Members of the Mexican Academy of Sciences